Organisation for the Advancement of Anioma Culture (OFAAC) is the culture umbrella body of the Anioma people, in Delta State, Nigeria. It was established in November 2003 with the core focus in preservation, promotion, and advancement of the appreciation and development of the cultural heritage of the Anioma people in Nigeria. OFAAC is a proactive commitment to the projection and advancement of the cultural heritage of Anioma people.

Aims and Objectives
The objectives of OFAAC as outlined by its founders are:

To preserve and advance Anioma culture by creating forum for exhibition and celebration of our rich heritage.
To foster unity among the people
To promote the use of our traditional attires
To create in the people, the Anioma consciousness and identity through cultural events
To promote our traditional cuisine.
To showcase to the outside world our rich culture through music, dance, fashion, drama, food etc. in well organized annual events.
To kick-state the adoption of this form of event as necessary harbinger to the cultivation of a reversal of attitude towards our culture especially among the teeming youth.
To organize seminars, workshops and lectures for the promotion of Anioma culture; and
To carry out research and development of Anioma Culture among others.

Leadership
OFAAC has a seven-member board of trustees. The members are: Chief Newton Jibunoh, Chief Philip Asiodu, Sir Fortune Ebie, Prof. Pat Utomi, Arc. Kester Ifeadi, Mr. Emeka Nmadu.

OFAAC Activity Vehicles
Since 2003, OFAAC has made appreciable progress in the mobilization of Anioma people with a sense of unity and provided a new platform for Anioma cultural revival. The major strategies and activities for this evolution are built around advocacy, workshops / lecture using the Anioma Annual Lecture Series, research and publication using the Anioma Essence Magazine, Cultural festival by organising the Annual Cultural Fiesta, Exhibitions and the Anioma MicroCredit Scheme.

Anioma Essence
Anioma Essence is a quarterly magazine published by the OFAAC. It serves well researched articles about Anioma as well as all the happenings around Anioma.

Anioma Cultural Festival
The Organization for the Advancement of Anioma Culture (OFAAC) as one of the strategies designed for the realization of its objectives since 2004 commenced her activities with cultural fiesta tagged “celebrating our people through our culture” with the zonal competition at the three Federal Constituencies of Delta North. This, since then has always been organized in two segments. The first is held in the three zones which represent the Federal Constituencies namely: Aniocha/Oshimili, Ika and Ndokwa/Ukwuani. Winners in the zonal levels qualify for the Grand Finale held at the state capital, Asaba.

While the zonal fiesta hosted a few thousands in zonal venues in Ogwashi-Uku, Agbor, and Kwale, the all important finals (Grand Finale) have always had over 10,000 persons as participants and audience. A galaxy of Royal fathers from Anioma area was always on hand to offer their royal solidarity to the event.

The Oshimili South Local Government Arcade, Asaba is always a beehive of cultural activities on those particular days that the final fiesta held. An array of cultural dancers who varied in types and styles grace the occasion, over 50 adult cultural groups and 18 in the children’s category throng the venue. Exhibition  of Arts and Crafts whose creativity was appreciated by the distinguished guests and participants take the centre stage while Anioma cuisine which make most guests journey to our roots for the appreciation of the original natural foods whose taste and sumptuousness our people used to relish.

A major feature of the fiesta has always been the huge financial outlay in form of cash prizes winners go home with. First prize is usually N300,000 : 00, second N200,000 :00 and third, N100,000 : 00. There is also the N500,000 : 00 set aside for winner of each categories of dances. Consolation prizes are usually given to other finalists who failed to clinch any positions. They get N10,000 : 00 each beside the transport subsidy given a few days to the event.

Participation of cultural groups from the zones is of utmost concern to OFAAC for without the people, its objective of fostering unity, oneness and the sense of belonging in Anioma would be in jeopardy. As it is customary in contests for some to win and some to lose, Aguba royal group of Ubulu-Uno in Aniocha South and Uloko Cultural Dance Group from Ndemili Utagba-Uno in Ndokwa West had to emerge sometime as champions 2004 and 2005 editions respectively.

The Royal Fathers of Anioma, State Governor, his Deputy and other Government Functionaries at both subordinate and superordinate levels have been a key part of this ‘OFAAC’ package and programmes of activities from the inception.

To ensure that our traditional rulers are effectively carried along, ‘OFAAC’ members regularly visit these custodians of our culture and tradition. The introduction of Anoma cultural fiesta was first preceded by numerous courtesy visits to these highly respected traditional rulers. Predictably, these royal fathers have been very receptive of the programmes of ‘OFAAC’ and have given enormous support to their efforts. The visits, long and extended, covered a large expanse of land constituting the geopolitical configuration known as Delta North Senatorial District. From Asaba  in Oshimili South Area through Abavo in Ika South to Amai in Ukwani, ‘OFAAC’ sought and received the co-operation and encouragement of these royal fathers.

A major revelation of the visits has been this show of solidarity and “the affirmation of the homogeneity of Anioma Nation in cultural matters and linguistic affinity”. Officials undertaking these visit in no place sought the assistance of interpreters. This, though, does not preclude the existence of a few dialectical departures, which nevertheless, do not attenuate their mutual intelligibility.

Anioma Annual Lecture Series
The Anioma Annual Lecture Series usually precedes the Anioma Cultural Festival. The first in the series of Anioma Annual Lecture, to further the aspirations Anioma was held in 2006 at MUSON Centre, Lagos. The theme was “Anioma Culture: The Past, The Present and The Future. The speaker was Chief Newton Jibunoh, former Chairman Costain West Africa and Desert Warrior, and chaired by Ambassador Segun Olusola, Former Nigerian Ambassador to Ethiopia.

The second in the series was also held in MUSON Centre, Onikan, Lagos in 2006 with the theme “Integration of Indigenous Architecture in contemporary Housing Development in Nigeria”. The lecture was delivered by Sir S.P.O. Fortune Ebie, former Managing Director of Federal Housing Authority, and chaired by Chief Ernest A.O. Shonekan, GCFR, CBE, former head of interim National Government of Nigeria.

Anioma Microcredit Scheme
The Micro Credit Scheme of the Organisation For the Advancement of Anioma Culture was introduced in 2005, aimed at empowering the poor and less privileged in Anioma nation by supporting them with micro-credit to boost their businesses at the grass root. The scheme is an important milestone in OFAAC’s poverty reduction drive in Anioma, which is consistent with Millennium Development Goals (MDGs) of United Nations’s desire to eradicate extreme poverty by the year 2015.

The scheme since its introduction has helped build sustainable business enterprises in Anioma nation. As thousands of small business owners in Anioma have had access to the micro credit scheme. Beyond cash disbursement to assist people engaged in farming, trading, arts and craft etc. Beneficiaries are also supported with farm implements, equipment acquisition and other materials.

References

External links
https://web.archive.org/web/20160304190715/http://234next.com/csp/cms/sites/Next/ArtsandCulture/TheatreDance/5557554-147/story.csp
http://www.thisdayonline.com/nview.php?id=91086

Igbo society